Ray Thomas (2 July 1940 – 20 May 2021) was an Australian rules footballer who played with Collingwood in the Victorian Football League (VFL).

Notes

External links 		

1940 births
2021 deaths
Australian rules footballers from Victoria (Australia)		
Collingwood Football Club players
Albury Football Club players